American Folk is a 2017 American drama film written and directed by David Heinz. The film stars Joe Purdy, Amber Rubarth, Krisha Fairchild, David Fine, Bruce Beatty and Elizabeth Dennehy. The film was released on January 26, 2018, by Good Deed Entertainment.  It's the story of two strangers, both folk musicians stranded in California, who take a road trip to New York in the days after the September 11 attacks. It's a heartwarming story about the kindness of strangers and the power of music.

Cast 
 Joe Purdy as Elliott
 Amber Rubarth as Joni
 Krisha Fairchild as Scottie
 David Fine as Dale
 Bruce Beatty as Mike
 Elizabeth Dennehy as Ann
 Miranda LaDawn Hill as Bianca
 Emma Thatcher as Emily
 Holger Moncada Jr. as Alejandro
 Julian Gopal as Carlos
 Paul White as Fargo
 Shelly West as Kelly
 Maryann Strossner as Kathryn

Release
Originally titled 'SEPTEMBER 12TH' the film premiered at the Santa Barbara International Film Festival on February 3, 2017, and won the Best American Independent award at the Cleveland International Film Festival in April 2017. On May 16, 2017, Good Deed Entertainment acquired distribution rights to the film. The film was released into theaters on January 26, 2018, by Good Deed Entertainment.

Reception

The film has a fresh rating of 77% on Rotten Tomatoes, with Katie Walsh of the Los Angeles Times saying "The songs are lovely, and the first-time actors give performances that grow warmer as the film progresses," and Romantic Intentions Quarterly calling it "a gentle, undulating movie, much like the scenery – and, often, music – it so gorgeously showcases." In contrast, Christopher Kompanek of The Washington Post gave the film a negative review, saying "... the songs lend the film an emotional resonance that the forced dialogue often struggles to achieve."

References

External links
 

2017 films
2017 drama films
2010s drama road movies
American drama road movies
Films about music and musicians
Films about guitars and guitarists
Films about vans
Films based on the September 11 attacks
Films set in 2001
Films set in Arkansas
Films set in Los Angeles
Films set in Oklahoma
Films set in Texas
Films set in Virginia
Films set in Tennessee
Films set in Pennsylvania
Films set in New Mexico
Films set in New Jersey
Films set in New York City
2010s English-language films
2010s American films